James Noble was the 2016 winner of the Dahl-Nygaard Prize.  He was Professor of Computer Science at the Victoria University of Wellington, in Wellington, New Zealand until February 2022.

Noble is a Fellow of the Institute of IT Professionals of New Zealand and the British Computer Society, and a Member of the Association for Computing Machinery, the Institute of Electrical and Electronics Engineers, and Engineering New Zealand Te Ao Rangahau. He held a James Cook Research Fellowship from the Royal Society of New Zealand in 2015 and 2016. Noble is the founding Editor-In-Chief of the journal Transactions on Pattern Languages of Programming (published by Springer).

Noble has a world-leading reputation for his work on object-orientation. He has published over 300 papers. He is known for his pioneering work in programming language design, especially through his contributions to novel type systems such as ownership types and pluggable types. He has contributed to object-oriented and aspect-oriented approaches to software design, design patterns and the analysis of software corpus, software visualisation and visual languages, user interaction and agile development methodologies.

References

Living people
New Zealand computer scientists
Victoria University of Wellington alumni
Academic staff of the Victoria University of Wellington
Senior Members of the ACM
Members of the British Computer Society
Year of birth missing (living people)